FC Tatabánya is a Hungarian football club based in Tatabánya. They play their home games at Stadion Gyula Grosics.

History 
The Tatabányai Sport Klub was founded on February 6, 1910 by Ferenc Frei, a mining engineer.  At this time several Hungarian towns outside of Budapest had formed football clubs – Debrecen, Miskolc, Győr.

The First World War weakened the team, but in the 1920s the team was still without a doubt the most popular in Tatabánya. Professionalism was introduced into the Hungarian League, but the team couldn't afford this, and stuck with amateur players. After the end of the Second World War in 1947 the team reached the first division.

On 28 March 2017, Tatabánya were disqualified from the 2016–17 Nemzeti Bajnokság III season.

European cup history

UEFA Cup Winners' Cup

UEFA Intertoto Cup

UEFA Cup

Selected former managers 
  Károly Lakat 1957–1962
  Gyula Grosics 1963
  Gábor Kléber 1964–1965
  Nándor Hidegkuti 1966
  László Hári 1967–1968
  György Szűcs 1968–1969
  Károly Lakat 1970–1974
  József Gelei 1974–1975
  Tivadar Monostori 1975
  Ede Moór 1975–1976
  Tivadar Monostori 1977–1979
  Antal Szentmihályi 1979–1980
  Károly Lakat 1980–1982
  Jenő Dalnoki 1982–1984
  István Bacsó 1984–1985
  Károly Lakat 1985
  Miklós Temesvári 1985–1988
  Antal Szentmihályi 1988–1990
  Barnabás Tornyi 1990–1991
  Gyula Rákosi 1991–1992
  Károly Csapó 1992
  Ferenc Ebedli 1997–1998
  Bálint Tóth −1999
  József Kiprich 1999–2001
  Ferenc Ebedli 2001
  László Kovács 2001–
  József Török −2003
  Lajos Détári 2004
  Tibor Sisa 2004–2007
  Barnabás Tornyi 2007
  Ferenc Mészáros  2007
  László Borbély  2007
  Octavio Zambrano and László Dajka  2008–2009
  P. László Nagy 2009–2011
  József Kiprich 2011–2012
  Aurél Csertői 2012–2013
  P. László Nagy 2013
  Péter Bozsik 2013–2014
  Gyula Plotár 2014 (caretaker)
  Attila Miskei 2014–

External links 
 Club FC Tatabánya squad 
  Official site
  Turul Ultrái Official site
 Detailed international matches list

References

 
Tatabanya
Tatabánya
1910 establishments in Hungary
Tatabánya